Three Guests (often abbreviated as 3G) are an American vocal group, formed in Erie, Pennsylvania in 2015. The group consists of Jordan Rys and Noah DeVore.

The group rose to fame with their debut single “Marilyn” (2017). They signed with Priority Records and released their single “die 4 u” (2017). In the following year they released their EP, 3G (2018) with Priority Records.

History 
In 2015 Noah DeVore began writing songs while playing the piano. He told Jordan Rys about the songs and they decided to form the band Three Guests. They bought inexpensive microphones to record and began performing at small local venues. They discovered TuneGO online and joined their site. This is how they were signed to TuneGO Music Group and decided to move to Las Vegas, where TuneGO is located.

In 2017 Three Guests released their first single and music video “Marilyn” (2017). They moved to Vegas to be closer to their label, TuneGO Music Group. They were signed to Priority Records in 2017 and released their single “die 4 u” (2017). In 2018 they released their first EP, 3G (2018) with Priority Records. With major success, they released their second EP Sunset Lane under TuneGO.

Members 
 Jordan Rys (2015–present)
 Noah DeVore (2015–present)
Ben Waldee (2015-2018)

Discography 
 "Marilyn"  (2017)
 "die 4 u" (2017)
 3G (2018)  
Sunset Lane (2018)

References

External links 

 Official website

American vocal groups
Musical groups from Pennsylvania
Musicians from Erie, Pennsylvania
Musical groups established in 2015
2015 establishments in Pennsylvania